Ahmad Wartam (1935 – 29 November 2014) was a Singapore international footballer who played as a goalkeeper. He is the father of former Singapore international striker Fandi Ahmad, and grandfather to Ikhsan and Irfan Fandi.

Ahmad started his football career as a left winger before switching to goalkeeping after a knee injury. He played for Fathul Karib in the SAFA League, and for Singapore FA in the Malaysia Cup. Following a neck injury to regular custodian Wilfred Skinner, he played in Singapore's victory in the 1967 FAM Cup final. He retained his place in the 1967 Malaysia Cup after Skinner was dropped from the squad and started the final in a 2–1 loss to Perak.

In October 2014, Ahmad was admitted into intensive care at Tan Tock Seng Hospital for heart and lung problems. He died a month later on 29 November.

Honours 
Singapore FA
 FAM Cup: 1967

References 

1935 births
2014 deaths
Singaporean footballers
Singapore international footballers
Association football goalkeepers
Singapore FA players
Balestier Khalsa FC players